Government Hill is a hill in Central, Hong Kong.

Government Hill may also refer to:

 Government Hill, Anchorage, Alaska, United States
 Siletz Agency Site, a historic site and park in Oregon, United States
 Government Hill, a neighborhood in Central El Paso, Texas, United States
 Fort Canning Hill, formerly known as the Government Hill, Singapore from 1824 to 1861